The Consecration of the Soldiers' National Cemetery was the ceremony at which U.S. President Abraham Lincoln delivered the Gettysburg Address on November 19, 1863.  In addition to the 15,000 spectators, attendees included six state governors: Andrew Gregg Curtin of Pennsylvania, Augustus Bradford of Maryland, Oliver P. Morton of Indiana, Horatio Seymour of New York, Joel Parker of New Jersey, and David Tod of Ohio.  Reporters present included Joseph Gilbert (Associated Press), Charles Hale (Boston Advertiser), John Russell Young (Philadelphia Press); and Cincinnati Commercial, New York Tribune, & The New York Times reporters.

Planning
Following the Battle of Gettysburg, an Evergreen Cemetery Association plan to create a soldiers annex requiring fee payments for interments (e.g., by families) was replaced by a plan by local attorney David Wills for a cemetery funded by the states.  The Pennsylvania governor designated Wills the commonwealth's agent, who was authorized to purchase  for a cemetery, paying $2,475.87 for the land ($ as of ).  Wills' September 23 invitation to the renowned statesman Edward Everett requested an oration on Wednesday, October 23;  but Everett needed more time to prepare his speech, which would feature fine details of the battle culled from Everett's personal interviews with those involved.  Wills rescheduled the ceremony to Thursday, November 19 to accommodate Everett's needs.  On November 2, Lincoln received formal notice of Wills' invitation to participate.

Preceding events
On October 27 from the Presbyterian graveyard on North Washington street (now defunct), the 1st of 3,512 Union Army bodies  was moved to the new cemetery.  By November 19, a speaker's platform had been constructed, and "1258 had been reburied in the semicircular cemetery".

On November 18 at 6:00 p.m., Abraham Lincoln and party (including his guest, Canadian politician William McDougall) arrived at the Gettysburg Railroad Station.  Lincoln walked around the depot and uphill to the town square to spend the night in the Wills' house, where a crowd gathered in the adjacent town square and was addressed by Secretary of State William H. Seward (Everett got to bed about 11 p.m.).  After Wills met with Lincoln about the ceremony ; Lincoln's door guard, 1st Sgt Hugh Paxton Bigham of Company B (21st PA Cav.), provided a telegram to Lincoln that his son had improved—after which he asked his guard "at about 11 p.m." to take him to Seward.  While meeting with Seward at the adjacent Robert Goodloe Harper house "around the corner", Lincoln was serenaded by the Baltimore Glee Club (National Union Musical Association) with We Are Coming, Father Abra'am (Bigham later "pushed" a return path through the crowd for Lincoln).  Also posted through the night was a second military guard for Lincoln at the street-level door, Paxton's brother Rush Bigham.

On November 19  when his secretary went to Lincoln's room, "Mr. Nicolay…found him at work upon the address which he was to deliver. He continued to write, so far as the many interruptions gave him opportunity, up to the time it was necessary for him to take his place in the procession".  At 9:30 a.m., Lincoln on a chestnut bay horse joined the procession to the cemetery with other dignitaries, townspeople, and widows.  "We passed along Baltimore Street to the Emmittsburg Road, minute guns being fired, then by way of the Taneytown Road to the cemetery, where the military formed in line to salute the President at about eleven o'clock."

Program
Scheduled events for the ceremony included:
Music, by Birgfield's Band
Prayer, by Reverend T.H. Stockton, D.D.  The cloudy day became sunny during the reverend's prayer.
Music, by the Marine Band
Oration, by Hon. Edward Everett Everett's two-hour delivery of 13,607 words described the battle and related its events and the war to previous wars and events.
Music, Hymn composed by Benjamin Brown French, Esq.  "A full view of the battlefield, with the Blue [Ridge] Mountains in the distance, was spread out before us, and all about were traces of the fierce conflict. Rifle pits, cut and scarred trees, broken fences, pieces of artillery wagons and harness, scraps of blue and gray clothing, bent canteens, abandoned knapsacks, belts, cartridge boxes, shoes and caps, were still to be seen on nearly every side—a great showing for relic hunters. … The Baltimore Glee Club then sang an ode written for the occasion by Commissioner B. B. French, of Washington, and Lincoln arose."
Dedicatory Remarks, by the President of the United States  Lincoln took but a few minutes for the "Address delivered at the dedication of the cemetery at Gettysburg" (Boston reporter Charles Hale "took down the slow-spoken words of the President").
Dirge, sung by Choir selected for the occasion
Benediction, by Reverend H.L. Baugher, D.D.

The program ended c. 4 p.m. and, after attending most of a subsequent service at the Presbyterian church with War of 1812 and Battle of Gettysburg veteran John L. Burns, Lincoln departed via the Gettysburg Railroad c. 6 p.m.

Aftermath

Following the ceremony, telegraphy regarding the program included at least three transmissions of Lincoln's address<ref>{{Cite book |last=Barton |first=William E |year=1950 |title=Lincoln at Gettysburg: What He Intended to Say; What He Said; What he was Reported to have Said; What he Wished he had Said |location=New York |publisher=Peter Smith |pages=138–139}}</ref> (the New York Times report the next day included both Lincoln's address and the entire Everett Oration.)

Wills requested a copy of Everett's oration via a December 14 letter, and Everett provided a copy with footnotes (e.g., describing the maps he used while composing).   In 1864, Everett published his book regarding the consecration; and an 1867 record of the consecration ceremony was published with the associated correspondence.

Erected by the Gettysburg National Military Park (G.N.M.P.), a permanent historical marker within the Gettysburg National Cemetery states, "The speakers' platform was located in Evergreen Cemetery to your left." The National Park Service's National Cemetery Walking Tour'' brochure concurs with the permanent marker:
The Soldiers' National Monument, long misidentified as the spot from which Lincoln spoke, honors the fallen soldiers. ... It was actually on the crown of this hill, a short distance on the other side of the iron fence and inside the Evergreen Cemetery, where President Lincoln delivered the Gettysburg Address to a crowd of some 15,000 people.

As recently as January 23, 2004, a multiple property submission by the GNMP extended the long history of misidentification by stating, the Soldiers' National Monument "Sits on site of speaker's platform where Gettysburg Address was orated."   Photographic analyses by Garry Wills and William A. Frassanito, completed in 1992 and 1995 respectively, conclusively place the location on the Evergreen Cemetery side of the dividing fence.

References

Gettysburg Battlefield
Presidency of Abraham Lincoln
History of Adams County, Pennsylvania
1863 in Pennsylvania
1863 in the United States
November 1863 events
National Cemetery at Gettysburg, Consecration
1863 establishments in Pennsylvania
Pennsylvania in the American Civil War